Jada is a dramatic film released in 2008. It was directed by Clifton Powell. The film was written by Daniel Chavez.

Plot
Jada is the story of a woman whose life becomes chaotic when her husband is killed in a questionable car accident. Her once-comfortable middle-class lifestyle comes crashing down when an insurance company labels the accident a suicide and refuses to pay her benefits as the survivor.

As a result, Jada and her two teenage children, Jasmine and Jamal, become homeless and have to live in their car until the pastor of a local church, the Rev. Terrence Mayweather, comes to their aid. The family finds shelter in a low-income housing project, but Jamal becomes entangled in the neighborhood gang. Throughout the ordeal, Jada's faith in God keeps the family together. An unlikely savior arrives in the person of Simon Williams, who has been released from prison on the Mayweather's strong recommendation. Simon becomes a mentor to Jamal in an attempt to steer him away from the gang, but tensions are high between Simon and the head of the gang, Jason Smith, whose nickname is "Thunder."

External links

2008 films
2008 drama films
African-American drama films
Hood films
American independent films
2000s English-language films
2000s American films